Kelly Frye is an American actress. She is best known for her roles in Criminal Minds: Beyond Borders, Criminal Minds, Rake and The Flash.

Early life
Frye was born in Houston, Texas and attended Clear Lake High School. Frye is one of five children. She has Irish and Australian roots. She graduated from Loyola Marymount University in 3 years with a BBA in international business and business law, with a minor in Asian-Pacific studies. She later moved to acting, to which she has been active since 2006.

Career
Frye's first acting role was a small part in the short film Twilight's Grace. After a few appearances in television and television films, she later received guest appearances in popular US series, including Life, House, The Mentalist, Body of Proof, NCIS: Los Angeles, Anger Management and The Flash.

In 2014, Frye started to receive more recurring roles. Her first recurring role was as Cindy Beck in Rake. This was followed by appearances in the soap operas General Hospital and The Young and the Restless. Then in 2016, Frye got the role of Kristy Simmons, the wife of Agent Matt Simmons (Daniel Henney) on Criminal Minds: Beyond Borders, the spin-off of the hit series Criminal Minds. In 2017, after the end of Criminal Minds: Beyond Borders, her role was of Kristy Simmons was added to the original series, Criminal Minds, after Henney was added to the main cast.
She then was cast on the new Disney Channel series “Secrets of Sulphur Springs,”. She plays a young mother whose family has just bought and moved into a supposedly haunted hotel. Her character, who is skeptical of any supernatural shenanigans, called for a bit of acting on Frye’s part. “Ghosts are real,” swears the Houston native.

Filmography

Film

Television

References

External links 
 

Living people
Actresses from Houston
Loyola Marymount University alumni
American film actresses
American television actresses
21st-century American actresses
Year of birth missing (living people)